The 3rd constituency of Vaucluse is a French legislative constituency in the Vaucluse département (Provence-Alpes-Côte d'Azur). Marion Maréchal-Le Pen, a member of the National Front, represented the constituency during the XIV legislature (2012–2017). It has been held by Brune Poirson and her substitute, Adrien Morenas of REM since 2017.

History, geography and demography 
According to the division into constituencies by the law n°86-1197 of 24 November 1986, the 3rd constituency of Vaucluse included six cantons : Bédarrides, Carpentras-Nord, Carpentras-Sud, Mormoiron, Pernes-les-Fontaines, Sault. According to the national census conducted in 1999 by the French National Institute for Statistics and Economic Studies (INSEE), the total population of the constituency was estimated at 127,749 inhabitants.

Approved in February 2010 by the Constitutional Council of France, the redistricting of electoral boundaries came into effect from the 2012 legislative elections. Ratified on 21 January 2010 by the Parliament of France, the ordonnance n°2009-935 of 29 July 2009 reduced the area of the constituency.

After the boundary changes, the population of the constituency amounted to 96,291 inhabitants in 2008 and 97,206 inhabitants in 2009.

Deputies

Election results

2022 

 
 
|-
| colspan="8" bgcolor="#E9E9E9"|
|-

2017

 
 
 
 
 
 
 
|-
| colspan="8" bgcolor="#E9E9E9"|
|-

2012

2007

 
 
 
 
 
 
 
 
|-
| colspan="8" bgcolor="#E9E9E9"|
|-

2002

 
 
 
 
|-
| colspan="8" bgcolor="#E9E9E9"|
|-

1997

 
 
 
 
 
 
|-
| colspan="8" bgcolor="#E9E9E9"|
|-

References

Sources
  Notes and portraits of the French MPs under the Fifth Republic, French National Assembly
  Vaucluse's 3rd constituency: cartography, National Assembly of France
  2012 French legislative elections: Vaucluse's 3rd constituency (first round and run-off), Minister of the Interior (France)

3
Politics of Provence-Alpes-Côte d'Azur
Vaucluse